Wael Ben Romdhane (born 12 December 1992) is a retired Tunisian football midfielder.

References

1992 births
Living people
Tunisian footballers
AS Djerba players
Stade Gabèsien players
AS Gabès players
Association football midfielders
Tunisian Ligue Professionnelle 1 players